Calciphila is a genus of flowering plants belonging to the family Apocynaceae.

Its native range is Somalia.

Species:

Calciphila galgalensis 
Calciphila gillettii

References

Apocynaceae
Apocynaceae genera